Al-Karmel SC is a Jordanian football club which is based in AL Husn Camp, Jordan, just outside the city of Irbid. The football club competes in the Jordan League Division 1.

Current squad

Managerial history
 Issa Al-Turk
 Jabbar Hamid
 Hisham Abdul-Munam
 Muneeb Gharaibeh

Kit Providers
Uhlsport

External links
فريق: الكرمل
Al-Karmel Irbid (19/20)

Karmel